Rhagoletis flavicincta is a species of tephritid or fruit flies of the family Tephritidae found in Eastern Europe and Asia.

References

flavicincta
Diptera of Asia
Diptera of Europe
Taxa named by Günther Enderlein
Insects described in 1934